The Montefiore Windmill is a landmark windmill in Jerusalem. Designed as a flour mill, it was built in 1857 on a slope opposite the western city walls of Jerusalem, where three years later the new Jewish neighbourhood of Mishkenot Sha'ananim was erected, both by the efforts of British Jewish banker and philanthropist Moses Montefiore. Jerusalem at the time was part of Ottoman-ruled Palestine. Today the windmill serves as a small museum dedicated to the achievements of Montefiore. It was restored in 2012 with a new cap and sails in the style of the originals. The mill can turn in the wind.

History

Ottoman era
The windmill and the neighbourhood of Mishkenot Sha'ananim were both funded by the British Jewish banker and philanthropist Moses Montefiore, who devoted his life to promoting industry, education and health in the Land of Israel. Montefiore built the windmill with funding from the estate of an American Jew, Judah Touro, who appointed Montefiore executor of his will. Montefiore mentions the windmill in his diaries (1875), noting that he had built it 18 years earlier on the estate of Kerem-Moshe-ve-Yehoodit (lit. "the orchard of Moses and Judith"), and that it had since been joined by two other windmills nearby, owned by Greeks. The project, bearing the hallmarks of nineteenth-century artisan revival, aimed to promote productive enterprise in the yishuv.

The mill was designed by Messrs Holman Brothers, the Canterbury, Kent millwrights. The stone for the tower was quarried locally. Parts were shipped to Jaffa, where there were no suitable facilities for landing the heavy machinery. Transport of the machinery to Jerusalem had to be carried out by camel. In its original form, the mill had a Kentish-style cap and four patent sails. It was turned to face into the wind by a fantail. The mill drove two pairs of millstones, flour dressers, wheat cleaners and other machinery.

The construction of the mill was part of a broader program to enable the Jews of Palestine to become self-supporting. Montefiore also built a printing press and a textile factory, and helped to finance several agricultural colonies. He attempted to acquire land for Jewish cultivation, but was hampered by Ottoman restrictions on land sale to non-Muslims.

The mill was not a success due to a lack of wind. Wind conditions in Jerusalem could not guarantee its continued operation. There were probably no more than 20 days a year with strong enough breezes. Another reason for the mill's failure was technological. The machinery was designed for soft European wheat, which required less wind power than the local wheat. Nevertheless, the mill operated for nearly two decades until the first steam-powered mill was completed in Jerusalem in 1878. In the late 19th century the mill became neglected and abandoned.

British Mandate
It was not until the 1930s that the mill was cosmetically restored by British Mandate authorities together with the Pro-Jerusalem Society. During this restoration decorative, non-functional fixed sails were placed at the top of the structure.

1947–48 civil war

During the 1948 blockade of Jerusalem the Jewish Haganah fighters built an observation post at the top of the tower. In an attempt to impede their activities, the British authorities ordered the windmill be blown up in an operation mockingly dubbed by the population "Operation Don Quixote." By chance however, the unit tasked with destroying the windmill happened to be from Ramsgate, home to Montefiore's long-time residence. When the soldiers observed the name of their hometown next to Montefiore's on a plaque displayed on the building, they "re-interpreted" their orders and blew up only the observation post at the top of the tower, rather than the entire structure.

State of Israel
Over the years the building's condition had deteriorated again and following the reunification of Jerusalem in the Six-Day War another cosmetic restoration was carried out, as part of which a decorative bronze cap was added to the structure.

Restoration

In 2012 the mill was completely restored to full working order using the original 1850s plans (which were located in the British Library) as a guide. The restoration was part of Israel's 60th anniversary celebrations.

A Dutch organisation, "Christians for Israel" promoted the scheme. A model of Stelling Minnis windmill, built by Tom Holman, was taken to the Netherlands to raise funds for the restoration. None of the original machinery survives. Millwright Willem Dijkstra rebuilt the floors, sails, cap and machinery in his workshop in Sloten in cooperation with Dutch construction company Lont and British millwright Vincent Pargeter. The windshaft was cast and machined at Sanders IJzergieterij en Machinefabriek B.V. (Sanders’ foundry and machines factory) in Goor. The parts were then shipped to Israel and reassembled on site. Dijkstra, his family and employee temporarily moved to Israel to help with the restoration. The cap and sails were lifted into place on July 25, 2012, and the mill was turning for the first time again on August 6. The first bag of flour was ground in May 2013.

Anecdotes
Two anecdotes about the windmill appear in a 1933 book, which refers to it as the Jaffa Gate Mill. The first is that there was much opposition from among the local millers to the windmill, who looked upon it with the evil eye and sent their head man to curse it. Predictions were made that the mill would be washed away during the rainy season; after it survived intact, it was declared to be the work of Satan. The second is that the Arabs developed a taste for the lubricating oil on the bearings and would lick them, prompting fear the mill would burn down from the resulting friction. The solution was said to be placing a leg of pork in the oil barrel, whereafter the Arabs lost a taste for the oil.

Montefiore carriage
In a glassed-in room at the windmill is a replica of the famous carriage Sir Moses Montefiore used in his travels. The original carriage was brought to Palestine in 1906 by Boris Schatz, the founder of the Bezalel Academy of Art, but was destroyed in a fire  in 1986. The carriage was part of the collection of the Bezalel Museum which became the basis of the Israel Museum.

See also
Tourism in Israel
Architecture of Israel

References

Windmills in Israel
Museums in Jerusalem
Tower mills
Windmills completed in 1857
Grinding mills in Israel
Buildings and structures in Jerusalem
Mill museums in Israel
Tourist attractions in Jerusalem
1857 establishments in the Ottoman Empire